is the capital city of Yamaguchi Prefecture, Japan. The city was founded on April 10, 1929. As of February 1, 2010, the city had an estimated population of 198,971 and a population density of 194.44 persons per km². The total area is 1,023.31 km².

Yamaguchi is home to the Buddhist temple, with its five-story pagoda.

Yamaguchi is served by Yamaguchi Ube Airport in nearby Ube.

History

Merger history
April 1, 1889: 40 towns were merged to form the town of Yamaguchi.
April 1, 1905: The village of Kami-unorei was merged into the town of Yamaguchi.
July 1, 1915: The village of Shimo-unorei was merged into the town of Yamaguchi.
April 10, 1929: The town of Yamaguchi absorbed the village of Yoshiki to create the city of Yamaguchi (1st Generation).
April 1, 1941: The village of Miyano was merged into the city of Yamaguchi.
April 1, 1944: The towns of Ogōri and Ajisu, and the villages of Hirakawa, Ōtoshi, Sue, Natajima, Aiofutajima, Kagawa and Sayama were merged with the city of Yamaguchi (1st Generation) to become the new city of Yamaguchi (2nd Generation). (At that time of the merger, all of them were from Yoshiki District.)
November 23, 1947: The town of Ajisu was broken off from Yamaguchi.
November 1, 1949: The town of Ogōri was broken off from Yamaguchi.
November 3, 1963: The village of Suzenji (from the Yoshiki District) merged into Yamaguchi.
May 1, 1963: The town of Ōuchi (from Yoshiki District) was merged into Yamaguchi.
October 1, 2005: Yamaguchi (2nd Generation) merged with town of Tokuji (from Saba District), and the towns of Aio, Ajisu and Ogōri (all from Yoshiki District) to create the 3rd city of Yamaguchi. Yoshiki District was dissolved as a result of this merger.
January 16, 2010: Yamaguchi absorbed the town of Atō (from Abu District).

Geography

Climate
Yamaguchi has a humid subtropical climate (Köppen climate classification Cfa) with hot summers and cool winters. Precipitation is significant throughout the year, but is much higher in summer than in winter.

Demographics
Per Japanese census data, the population of Yamaguchi in 2020 is 193,966 people. Yamaguchi has been conducting censuses since 1960.

Media

Newspaper
Yamaguchi Shimbun

TV
YAB TV (ANN)
KRY TV (NNN)
TYS TV (JNN)
NHK TV

Places of interest
 Rurikō-ji, a five-story pagoda and national treasure
 Yamaguchi Xavier Memorial Church
 Yamaguchi Prefectural Museum of Art
Ōuchi-shi Yakata - A castle ruin, one of the Continued Top 100 Japanese Castles
Kōnomine Castle - A castle ruin, one of the Continued Top 100 Japanese Castles.
 Chūya Nakahara Memorial Museum
 Yuda Onsen

Education
 Yamaguchi University (national)
 Yamaguchi Prefectural University

Transportation

Railways
JR West lines
Sanyō Shinkansen - Shin-Yamaguchi Station
San'yō Main Line
Yamaguchi Line
Ube Line

Expressways
Chūgoku Expressway
San'yō Expressway

Twin towns – sister cities

Yamaguchi is twinned with:

 Changwon, South Korea
 Gongju, South Korea
 Jinan, China
 Pamplona, Spain

Notes

1.Kami-Kanakoso, Shimo-Kanakoso, Yawatanobaba, Noda, Kami-Tatekōji, Shimo-Tatekōji, Ishigan-non, Dōso, Enseiji, Dōnomae, Ōichi, Shogan-shōji, Kubo-shōji, Sentō-shōji, Shinbaba, Ushirogawara, Nakagawara, Hayamada, Shin, Komeya, Otsubone-shōji, Ima-shōji, Nakaichi, Aimono-shōji, Tachiuri, Matsunoki, Kitano-shōji, Babadono-shōji, Yonedono-shōji, Dōjōmonzen, Imaichi, Imamichi, Wani-ishi, Ōzuke, Shinbashi, Nishimonzen, Itoyone-shōji, Arataka, Ta and Nakasanai (all from Yoshiki District)

References

External links

Yamaguchi City official website 

 
Cities in Yamaguchi Prefecture
2005 establishments in Japan